"Thirty Days" is the 103rd episode of the science fiction television series Star Trek: Voyager, the ninth episode of the fifth season. A spaceship in the late 24th century belonging to the Federation of Planets was taken by an alien to the other side of the Galaxy, upon escape they are faced with a decades long journey back to Earth. However, to survive the Federation ship must take on rebels known as the Maquis. In this episode we find out one of the bridge crew is in the ship's brig, and the episode then tells the tale of how this happened.

Plot
Lieutenant Tom Paris is demoted to Ensign and placed in Voyagers brig for thirty days for disobeying orders. During this, framing the episode, Paris relates the events to his personal log as a message to his father.

In flashback, Voyager meets with the non-native delegates of an ocean planet.  The delegates, including Riga and Burkus, explain that the planet is losing water mass at an alarming rate, threatening to destroy the planet in 5 years if it is not stopped.  Though they have some submarine vehicles, they are unable to reach the center of the planet where they believe the source of their problems can be found. The Voyager crew offers the use of the Delta Flyer, capable of withstanding the pressures at the planet's center. Paris, piloting the excursion with some of the planet's scientists including Riga, discover that the planet's core is a massive reactor, drawing the surface water of a nearby planet to it for unknown reasons. Further exploration reveals that oxygen-mining reactors used by the current population are the cause of the water loss.

The Voyager crew offer several technological options to minimize the water loss, but Burkus seems impassive about them. Even when Riga suggests turning off several of the oxygen-mining units, significantly prolonging the planet's existence but potentially decreasing the quality of life for the inhabitants, Burkus simply offers to pass these ideas to their government. The crew is eventually told that the government will not turn off the oxygen-mining facilities but politely thanks them for their assistance.

Urged on by Riga, Paris attempts to convince Captain Janeway to change the minds of the inhabitants, but Janeway refuses, citing that Voyager cannot get involved due to the Prime Directive. Furious at the decision, Paris and Riga steal the Delta Flyer, and attempt to use a photon torpedo to destroy one of the oxygen-mining facilities, but the remaining crew destroy the torpedo with a depth charge and recover the Delta Flyer. On return to Voyager, Janeway demotes Paris to the rank of ensign for disobeying orders and orders him to the brig for thirty days.

After the flashback ends, Tuvok goes to the brig, tells Paris that his thirty days have been served, and orders him to clean up and report for duty. In his quarters, Paris ends the message and sends it to his father.

Notes

 The original shoot of this episode was wholly the scenes of Tom Paris' adventure on the planet. When test screened the episode lacked the mandatory time length and so the brig scenes of the episode were formulated by Robert Beltran (Commander Chakotay) and added.
 The Monean scientist's instrument shown in the episode "Thirty Days" being the round prop carried by Riga for the purpose of measuring depth, pressure, etc., is the same prop used in the later episode "Dark Frontier" where it is described by Harry as a Borg "autonomous regeneration drone." and by Janeway as some sort of polytrinic alloy.
 The episode's original title was "Down Deep".
 This is the only episode in the series where the often-mentioned Delaney twins physically appear (albeit only in a hologram game and a deleted scene).

Releases 
On November 9, 2004, this episode was released as part of the season 5 DVD box set of Star Trek: Voyager. The box set includes 7 DVD optical discs with all the episodes in season 5 with some extra features, and episodes have a Dolby 5.1 Digital Audio track.

On April 25, 2001, this episode was released on LaserDisc in Japan, as part of the half-season collection, 5th Season vol.1 . This included episodes from "Night" to "Bliss" on seven double sided 12 inch optical discs, with English and Japanese audio tracks for the episodes.

References

External links
 

Star Trek: Voyager (season 5) episodes
1998 American television episodes
Fiction set on ocean planets